Marino Bizzi (Latin name: Marinus Bizzius; 1570–1624) was a Venetian patrician in Dalmatia, and a prelate of the Roman Catholic Church as Archbishop of Antivari.

Life
Bizzi was born on the island of Rab, part of the Republic of Venice (in present-day Croatia) to an aristocratic and wealthy family. He served as the island's bishop till 1608 when Pope Paul V appointed him as the Archbishop of Antivari and the administrator of the Bishopric of Budua (Budva).

Through Mahmut Bushati, Bizzi obtained a firman from Sultan Ahmed I, allowing him entry into Antivari. After obtaining the firman, Bizzi went off to live in the house of Asan Çelebi in Antivari. However, his life was always in danger. Because of unsettled conditions within his diocese, Bizzi had his seat in Budua, where he only lived for three years.

At the beginning of 1610, Bizzi had set off on a journey to visit his ecclesiastical regions, which were under Turkish, only to return by the end of the year. He travelled to Rab the following year, eventually settling in Rome, in Italy, where he died.

During his reign as Archbishop, he provided a detailed report of the Archbishopric, which would later become a widely used authentic historical source.

On another note, his reign also saw many Buduan locals from the Paštrović tribe (pleme) converted to Roman Catholicism.

See also
Mariano Bolizza (fl. 1614)

References

1570 births
1624 deaths
17th-century Roman Catholic archbishops in Serbia
Archbishops of Antivari
Republic of Venice nobility
17th-century Roman Catholic bishops in the Republic of Venice
People from Rab
Albanian Roman Catholics